Lapa may refer to:

People
 Bruno Lapa (born 1997), a Brazilian football player
 Dave Lapa (born 1949), a Belgian diamond trader
 Fernanda Lapa (1943–2020), a Portuguese actress
 Serhiy Lapa (born 1992), a Ukrainian football player

Places
 Lapa, Paraná, a town near Curitiba, in the state of Paraná in the Southern Region of Brazil
 Lapa, Rio de Janeiro, a neighbourhood in the city of Rio de Janeiro, Brazil
 Lapa (district of São Paulo), a district of the city of São Paulo, Brazil
 Lapa do Santo, an archaeological site in the state of Minas Gerais, Brazil
 Subprefecture of Lapa, a subprefecture of the city of São Paulo, Brazil
 Lapa Island or Wanzai, a Chinese island to the west of the Macau Peninsula and the Macau islands of Taipa and Coloane
 Lapa, Nepal, a village in Nepal
 Lapa (Lisbon), a neighbourhood in the city of Lisbon, Portugal
 Lapa, Cayey, Puerto Rico, a barrio
 Lapa, Salinas, Puerto Rico, a barrio
 Lapa Sarak, a village in Iran

Other uses
 Lapa (instrument), a musical instrument from 19th-century China
 Lapa (structure), a type of building that is popular in South Africa
 Lâpa, a kind of rice gruel found in the Balkans, Levant, and Middle East
 Líneas Aéreas Privadas Argentinas (LAPA), a defunct Argentine airline
 Lowland paca or 

See also
 Chapel of Nossa Senhora da Lapa (Sernancelhe), a sanctuary in Portugal
 Iapa (disambiguation)